The Mountains are a Danish electronic trio made up of Michael Møller and the twins Fridolin Nordsø and Frederik Nordsø, who joined forces to form a synth-pop and electronic music band. The band is signed to Warner Music Denmark and their debut album, titled The Mountains, the Valleys, the Lakes, was released on 10 March 2014. Two singles were released from the album: "The Mountains" and "The Valleys".

"The Valleys" was featured on the FIFA 15 soundtrack.

Members
The trio have had earlier musical success. The twin brothers Fridolin and Frederik Nordsø were members of The William Blakes,<ref name=gbd>[http://goodbecausedanish.com/2014/03/the-mountains-the-mountains-the-valleys-the-lakes-2/ GoodBecauseDanish.com: The Mountains - Review of The Mountains, the Valleys, the Lakes]</ref> a Danish pop/rock group formed in 2006 that also included Kristian Leth and Bo Rande; they released five studio albums: Wayne Coyne (2008), Dear Unknown Friend (2009), The Way of the Warrior (2010), Music Wants to Be Free (2011), and An Age of Wolves (2013), all on the Speed of Sound record label. They are also well known record producers who have worked with many artists including Burhan G, Brandy, and Fallulah.

Michael Møller was part of Moi Caprice (stylized as moi Caprice), a Danish indie rock group that also included David Brunsgaard, Jakob Millung, Casper Henning Hansen, and earlier Christian Hillesø. The band released four albums: Once Upon a Time in the North (2003), You Can't Say No Forever (2005), The Art of Kissing Properly (2006), and We Had Faces Then (2008); three EPs: Daisies and Beatrice (2002), Summerfool (2002), and Artboy Meets Artgirl (2003); and a remix album titled To the Lighthouse.

Discography
Albums
 The Mountains, the Valleys, the Lakes (2014)
 When We Were Kings (2016)
 Before and After Hollywood '' (2020)

References

External links
 
 Official Facebook page

Danish musical groups